Vykhodnoy is a rural locality (a railway station) under the administrative jurisdiction of the urban-type settlement of Molochny in Kolsky District of Murmansk Oblast, Russia, located beyond the Arctic Circle. Population: 37 (2010 Census).

References

Notes

Sources

Rural localities in Murmansk Oblast